The 2002 V8 Supercar season was the 43rd year of touring car racing in Australia since the first runnings of the Australian Touring Car Championship and the fore-runner of the present day Bathurst 1000, the Armstrong 500.

There were 20 V8 Supercar events held during 2002; a thirteen-round 2002 V8 Supercar Championship Series (VCS), two of them endurance races; a five-round second tier V8 Supercar series 2002 Konica V8 Supercar Series (KVS) along with a non-point scoring race supporting the Bathurst 1000 and a V8 Supercar support programme event at the 2002 Australian Grand Prix.

Results and standings

Race calendar
The 2002 Australian V8 Super season consisted of 20 events.

Netspace V8 Supercar Challenge 
This meeting was a support event of the 2002 Australian Grand Prix.

V8 Supercar Championship Series

Konica V8 Supercar Series

Konica V8 Supercar Challenge Race 
This race was a support event of the 2002 Bob Jane T-Marts 1000.

References

Additional references can be found in linked event/series reports.

External links
 Official V8 Supercar site
 2002 Racing Results Archive 

 
Supercar seasons